Aides is a Neotropical genus of skippers in the family Hesperiidae.

Species
The following species are recognised in the genus Aides:
Aides aegita (Hewitson, 1866) aegita silverpatch – Panama to Bolivia and Brazil 
Aides aestria (Hewitson, 1866) type locality Brazil 
Aides brilla (H. Freeman, 1970) brilliant silverpatch – southeast Mexico, Guatemala, Belize 
Aides brino (Stoll, 1781) brino silverpatch – Honduras, Colombia to Guianas and north Brazil 
Aides duma
Aides duma duma Evans, 1955 type locality Argentina
Aides duma argyrina Cowan, 1970 Panama to south Brazil 
Aides dysoni Godman, 1900 Dyson's silverpatch – east Mexico to Colombia 
Aides ocrinus (Plötz, 1882) ocrinus silverpatch – Panama, Colombia, French Guiana

References
Natural History Museum Lepidoptera genus database

Hesperiinae
Hesperiidae of South America
Hesperiidae genera
Taxa named by Gustaf Johan Billberg